Daniel Steininger (born 13 April 1995) is a German professional footballer who plays for  club SpVgg Bayreuth. He played for the youth teams of DJK Sonnen, FC Sturm Hauzenberg, 1. FC Passau, SpVgg Grün-Weiß Deggendorf, and Greuther Fürth.

Club career
Steininger came to SpVgg Greuther Fürth in 2010 after having played for DJK Sonnen, Sturm Hauzenberg, 1. FC Passau and SpVgg Grün-Weiß Deggendorf as a youth player. He started at the clubs youth team, before in 2013 - although still eligible to play for the A-Jugend team - he was promoted into the second team that played in the Regionalliga Bayern. After good performances, he began training with the first team from January 2014. Shortly afterwards he signed his first professional contract until 2018.

In the summer of 2014, Steininger was loaned out to 3. Liga club SSV Jahn Regensburg until the end of the 2014–15 season in order to develop further and to gain match practice. Steininger made his professional debut for Regensburg on 2 August 2014 in a 3. Liga match against Stuttgarter Kickers. Regensburg lost the match 1–3. 25 more games followed, in which he was able to score five goals.

After his return, the attacker played mainly for the Regionalliga team, but was also used occasionally in the 2. Bundesliga. After a meniscus injury sustained in preparation for the 2019–20 season, Steininger, who had recovered, was active as a test player in friendly matches during the winter break in the training camp of 3. Liga club 1. FC Magdeburg. Steininger was then signed up and received a contract valid until June 2021.

International career
On 5 March 2014, he made his debut for the German U19 as he came on in the 89th minute in a friendly against Italy.

Honours
SpVgg Bayreuth
 Regionalliga Bayern: 2021–22

References

External links
 

1995 births
Living people
Association football forwards
German footballers
Germany youth international footballers
SSV Jahn Regensburg players
SpVgg Greuther Fürth players
1. FC Magdeburg players
SpVgg Bayreuth players
2. Bundesliga players
3. Liga players
People from Passau
Sportspeople from Lower Bavaria
Footballers from Bavaria